John or Jack Quinn may refer to:

Politicians and lawyers
John Quinn (advocate) (1954–2022), Attorney General of the Isle of Man
John Quinn (collector) (1870–1924), lawyer, collector of manuscripts and paintings, friend of T. S. Eliot and Ezra Pound
John Quinn (Missouri politician) (born 1950), Member of the Missouri House of Representatives
John Quinn (New York politician) (1839–1903), Congressman from New York
John B. Quinn, American lawyer
John F. Quinn (born 1963), Massachusetts state representative
John R. Quinn (politician) (1889–1979), served on the Los Angeles County Board of Supervisors
Jack Quinn (lawyer) (born 1949), White House counsel, 1995–1996
Jack Quinn (politician) (born 1951), Congressman from New York
Jack Quinn III (born 1978), Assemblyman from Erie County, New York and son of the Congressman

Sportsmen

John Quinn (baseball executive) (1908–1976), baseball general manager
John Quinn (Canterbury cricketer) (born 1970), New Zealand cricketer
John Quinn (catcher) (1885–1956), baseball catcher for the 1911 Philadelphia Phillies
John Quinn (footballer) (born 1938), English professional footballer, 1959–1976
John Quinn Sr. (1875–1954), Australian rules footballer
John Quinn (umpire) (1897–1968), baseball umpire
John Quinn (Wellington cricketer) (1889-1967), New Zealand cricketer
John Quinn (wrestler) (1941–2019), Canadian professional wrestler
Johnny Quinn (born 1983), American football wide receiver
Jack Quinn (baseball) (1883–1946), baseball pitcher
Jack Quinn (footballer, born 1874) (1874–1918), Australian footballer with Geelong
Jack Quinn (footballer, born 1918) (1918–2006), Australian rules footballer with South Melbourne, Richmond and Melbourne
Jack Quinn (Gaelic footballer), Meath Gaelic football player
Jack Quinn (ice hockey) (born 2001), Canadian ice hockey forward
Jack Quin (1890–1953), Scottish footballer

Other occupations
John Quinn (diplomat) (1919–1961), Australian diplomat
John Quinn (physicist) (1933–2018), American theoretical physicist
John A. Quinn (1932–2016), professor of chemical and biomolecular engineering
John C. Quinn (1925–2017), American journalist
John M. Quinn (born 1945), Roman Catholic bishop
John M. J. Quinn (1886–1955), monsignor
John R. Quinn (1929–2017), Roman Catholic archbishop
Jonny Quinn (born 1972), drummer for Snow Patrol

Characters
John Quinn, character in The Southern Vampire Mysteries
Jack Quinn, character in the 1997 action film Double Team
John Quinn, a minor antagonist in the seventh season of 24

See also
Jonathan Quinn (born 1975), former American football quarterback
John O'Quinn (1941–2009), Texas lawyer
Sean Quinn (disambiguation)